Ken Price (born 6 January 1941) is a British weightlifter. He competed at the 1972 Summer Olympics and the 1976 Summer Olympics.

References

1941 births
Living people
British male weightlifters
Olympic weightlifters of Great Britain
Weightlifters at the 1972 Summer Olympics
Weightlifters at the 1976 Summer Olympics
Place of birth missing (living people)
20th-century British people